Elaine Pope is a Canadian writer and film producer. Born in Montreal, Quebec, she began her career writing TV specials for Lily Tomlin, including the 1981 TV special Lily: Sold Out, as well as the ABC-TV live sketch-comedy show Fridays (a rival of Saturday Night Live) and the HBO series Not Necessarily the News.  She won an Emmy Award for co-writing the episode "The Fix-Up" for the TV series Seinfeld and was the producer and co-writer for the 2004 remake of Alfie starring Jude Law.

Personal life
Pope's sister is rock singer Carole Pope.

References

External links 

Elaine Pope TV.com
'Seinfeld' - A History
'Northern Exposure' dominates Emmys

Living people
Anglophone Quebec people
Canadian television writers
Canadian women film producers
Emmy Award winners
People from Montreal
Year of birth missing (living people)
Canadian women television writers
Film producers from Quebec
Writers from Quebec